Vajrang Shetty (born 31 July 1990), also known by the birth name Mani Shetty is a South Indian film actor who works primarily in Kannada cinema. Vajrang starred as the lead actor in the Kannada Horror film Mantram (film) and acted in over 6 films in total.

Early life 
Vajrang hails from a middle-class Bunt Family. His father is a farmer. He did his primary and high-school education in Government School of Thekkatte, Kundapur, Karnataka. He completed his Pre University education at Viveka Junior College, Kota, Udupi District, and obtained his Bachelor's Degree from Tunga Mahavidyalaya Thirthahalli. He was also titled as Coondapur.com's MR. KUNDAPURA in the year 2014.

Vajrang started his career from Siddhartha (2015 film) as the main villain with the character name "JANI". This movie was directed Milana fame director Prakash. He was also seen in the role of DEEPAK in the movie Madha Mathu Manasi.

Filmography

References

External links 
 
 
 Vajrang Shetty on BookMyShow

Indian male film actors
Male actors in Kannada cinema
Living people
21st-century Indian male actors
1990 births